Not Without My Sister is a 2007 best-selling book written by sisters, Juliana Buhring, Celeste Jones and Kristina Jones. The book details their life, and eventual escape, from the Children of God group. It was number 1 on the Sunday Times best-seller list for 5 weeks, and remained in the top 10 list for 15 consecutive weeks. It has been translated into nine languages.

External links
Not Without My Sister — The official site for the book. Includes a guest-book, author biographies, photographs, a blog and excerpts from the book. 
Review of the book — with many links to press coverage.
Author Juliana Buhring's personal website.

2007 non-fiction books
Autobiographies
HarperCollins books